The Okuti River is a river of Banks Peninsula, in the Canterbury region of New Zealand's South Island. It flows west to meet the Okana River.

See also
List of rivers of New Zealand

References

Rivers of Canterbury, New Zealand
Rivers of New Zealand